Adam Somers Klugman (born July 11, 1963) is an American media strategist and campaign consultant. He and his older brother David are the sons of stage, film, and television actor Jack Klugman and actress, singer, and comedian Brett Somers. He had an older half-sister Leslie Klein (d. 2006) from his mother's first marriage. As a child, Adam appeared with his father on The Odd Couple.

He was a top-10 finalist in the 2003 MoveOn.org "Bushin30Seconds" contest and winner of the 2004 DNC Video Contest with "America's Party". His more recent projects include Mad As Hell Doctors and First Freedom First.

A resident of West Linn, Oregon, Klugman is a liberal and has worked on local elections, including ones for "No Growth" candidates in West Linn and for Oregon Ballot Measure 49. From 2010 to 2012, he hosted a liberal radio show called Mad as Hell in America with Adam Klugman.

References

External links

 Mad as Hell in America with Adam Klugman

Living people
People from West Linn, Oregon
American people of Canadian descent
American people of Russian-Jewish descent
Place of birth missing (living people)
1963 births
American talk radio hosts